Erodium texanum, also known as Texas filaree, Texas stork's bill, or heronbill, is a flowering plant which is native to the southwestern United States and northern Mexico. It is an annual or biennial herb.

External links
 Treatment from the Jepson Manual

texanum
Flora of the Southwestern United States
Flora of Mexico
Plants described in 1849